L'Île-des-Pins is a commune in the South Province of New Caledonia, an overseas territory of France in the Pacific Ocean. L'Île-des-Pins is made up of the Isle of Pines, the smaller Kôtomo Island, and several islets around these two, as well as the distant island of Walpole, which is located almost  to the east. The Isle of Pines and adjacent islands are located to the south of New Caledonia's mainland. At 16,830 km from Paris, L'Île-des-Pins is further from the French capital than any other commune of France. The settlement of Vao, on the Isle of Pines, is the administrative centre of the commune of L'Île-des-Pins.

L'Île-des-Pins is one of the main tourist attractions in New Caledonia. The Isle of Pines itself is nicknamed l'île la plus proche du paradis ("the closest island to Paradise"). L'Île-des-Pins can be reached by boat or plane from Nouméa, the capital of New Caledonia. It is renowned for the intense blue colors of its waters and for the ancient pine tree groves spread throughout the Isle of Pines and the neighboring islands.

After the Paris Commune (1871), about 2,800 Parisian insurgents were deported to L'Île-des-Pins, a part of whose territory was turned into a penal settlement where the convicts lived for several years.

In 2005 L'Île-des-Pins gained attention when season 5 of French reality show Les Aventuriers de Koh-Lanta ("The Adventurers of Koh Lanta"), the French version of Survivor, was set on several small islands off the Isle of Pines.

References

External links

 Audio interview (in English) with Isle of Pines resident available at ULiveWhere.com
Jane's Isle of Pines Page
Map of L'Île-des-Pins

Iledespins